Hana Hussein Naghawi (born March 3, 1971), a Jordanian civil engineering professor of Circassian origin.

On October 14, 2019, Naghawi became the first woman to be awarded a professor's position in civil engineering in Jordan. Louisiana State University indicated on its website that Naghawi "made history." Naghawi was also the first woman to awarded a professorship in all engineering disciplines within the University of Jordan, after working in university teaching for nine years.

References

1971 births
Living people
University of Jordan alumni
Louisiana State University
Jordanian engineers
Academic staff of the University of Jordan